Agoueinit  is a rural commune in Mauritania.

It is also the name of a neighbour town (Agounit) in Western Sahara, in the "Liberated Territories", controlled by the Polisario Front.

Communes of Mauritania